The Colton's Crossing Bridge, in Ransom County, North Dakota near Lisbon, North Dakota, also known as Sheyenne River Bridge, was built in 1907.  It was listed on the National Register of Historic Places (NRHP) in 1997.

According to its NRHP nomination, the
bridge serves as a representative example of the pattern; it is the oldest documented bridge in [Ransom County] constructed by a long-term county bridge builder, the Hewett Bridge Company. The bridge is also significant ... for its association with attempts by North Dakota counties to expand and improve transportation networks prior to 1926 by construction of through truss bridges, relatively costly structures. Through truss bridges with documented construction dates and builders, such as this one, best illustrate this important trend in North Dakota bridge construction.
It is also significant as being the oldest surviving metal truss bridge in Ransom County.  It was built in 1907 for a contract price of $3,890.

It crosses the Sheyenne River.

References

Road bridges on the National Register of Historic Places in North Dakota
Bridges completed in 1907
National Register of Historic Places in Ransom County, North Dakota
Metal bridges in the United States
Truss bridges in the United States
Transportation in Ransom County, North Dakota
Lisbon, North Dakota
1907 establishments in North Dakota